Timothy Peter "T. J." Bell Jr. (born August 25, 1980) is an American professional stock car racing driver. He has primarily competed in NASCAR competition, driving in all three national touring series. He last competed part-time in the NASCAR Gander RV & Outdoors Truck Series, driving the No. 83 Chevrolet Silverado for CMI Motorsports and the No. 12 Silverado for Young's Motorsports.

Racing career
Bell began racing at the age of eight in go-karts and went on to win six consecutive championships in the state of Nevada. In 1997, he began racing in the SCCA F2000 Championship Series and won one out of the nine races he competed in. He soon moved up to the U.S. F2000 National Championship and was named the national spokesman for the Special Wish Foundation. In 2000, he joined the CART Toyota Atlantic Series, driving for Michael Shank Racing and posting five top-five finishes.  After another tun in Toyota Atlantic, Bell joined the ASCARI factory team, participating in several endurance races for the team, including the 24 Hours of Daytona, 12 Hours of Sebring, and 24 Hours of LeMans.

In 2003, Bell switched to stock car racing and began racing in the Truck Series. He drove a total of nine races in the No. 86 Defiant Clothing Chevrolet Silverado for Team Racing, his best finish a twelfth at Dover International Speedway. He also drove three races in the No. 53 truck owned by Mary Ward, but did not finish higher than 23rd. The following season, he moved to the ARCA RE/MAX Series to drive for Powertech Motorsports. He finished third in points and was named Rookie of the Year. He made eighteen starts in ARCA in 2005 and returned to the Truck Series, finishing sixteenth at Kentucky Speedway in a one-race deal with Glynn Motorsports. In the summer of 2005, he was hired by DCT Motorsports to drive their No. 36 Pontiac, earning a best finish of 22nd in eight races.

He drove a limited schedule for Bobby Jones Racing in 2006 in the ARCA Series, as well as driving the No. 07 Green Light Racing truck in the Truck Series. In 2007, Bell signed to drive sixteen races for Roush Fenway Racing's No. 50 Ford F-150 in the Trucks in 2007. Despite driving in elite equipment he had only one top-ten finish and ended the year 22nd in points. He finished out 2008 with TRG Motorsports when he replaced Andy Lally in the No. 7. Bell impressed many, scoring five top tens for TRG before leaving to drive Red Horse Racing's No. 11 Toyota vacated by David Starr. In 2010, he drove the No. 50 for new team MAKE Motorsports, and will drive with them in 2011.

Bell made his Cup Series debut at the May Darlington race, driving the No. 50 Chevrolet for Joe Falk, a Virginia car dealer who owned LJ Racing from 1997 to 2000. The car finished 38th after the transmission gave out after 67 laps. Bell ran several more races later in the year, attempting a run for Rookie of the Year honors.

In 2012, Bell ran full-time in the Nationwide Series for MAKE Motorsports, in addition to making selected Sprint Cup Series starts for FAS Lane Racing. He also ran selected races in the Truck Series for JJC Racing. In early August MAKE Motorsports began skipping races due to a lack of funding.

Since 2012, Bell has been a journeyman in the Truck and Xfinity Series. He has raced for various teams like Niece Motorsports and CMI Motorsports at the Truck level and MBM Motorsports and Obaika Racing in the Xfinity tier.

Images

Motorsports career results

NASCAR
(key) (Bold – Pole position awarded by qualifying time. Italics – Pole position earned by points standings or practice time. * – Most laps led.)

Sprint Cup Series

Xfinity Series

Gander RV & Outdoors Truck Series

* Season still in progress
1 Ineligible for series points

ARCA Re/Max Series
(key) (Bold – Pole position awarded by qualifying time. Italics – Pole position earned by points standings or practice time. * – Most laps led.)

Rolex Sports Car Series
(key)

24 Hours of Daytona

References

External links
 
 

Living people
1980 births
Sportspeople from Sparks, Nevada
Racing drivers from Nevada
24 Hours of Daytona drivers
NASCAR drivers
ARCA Menards Series drivers
Atlantic Championship drivers
U.S. F2000 National Championship drivers
Meyer Shank Racing drivers
RFK Racing drivers